Charles Leggett (20 September 1874 – 29 November 1934) was a Brighton-born cornetist who became known as "The World's Finest Cornet Soloist," and who was the favorite cornet soloist of King Edward VII.

He joined the Scots Guards Regimental Band a year after first hearing them at the Hove Exhibition in 1890, rising to become Band-Sergeant of the Scots Guards, and Principal Professor of Cornet at Kneller Hall of the Royal Military School of Music.

He was renowned in his day as the world's finest cornet soloist, and performed often at Buckingham Palace and Marlborough House for King Edward VII, who especially prized his rendition of "Softly Awakes My Heart," from Samson and Delilah. This is recorded on a Rena Double-Face Record (1266) as "Cornet Solo. By Sergt. Leggett. BAND OF H.M. SCOTS GUARDS. Conducted by Mr. F. W. Wood." The reverse is Arditi's "Il Bacio".

He was one of the first musicians hired by the BBC, in 1927, and stayed with them until his death, becoming principal cornet, deputy conductor and general supervisor of the BBC Wireless Military Band. Various recordings of him with the Orchestra are extant.

He lived at 87 Melody Road, Wandsworth.

His name lives on in The Leggett Award of £5,000 awarded by the Musicians' Benevolent Fund for "outstanding brass and woodwind players".

He was buried with full military honours in Wandsworth Cemetery.

References

1874 births
1934 deaths
English cornetists